Eurylepis poonaensis, the Poona skink, is a species of skink found only in Maharashtra, India.

References

 Griffith, H., A. Ngo & R. W. Murphy. 2000. A cladistic evaluation of the cosmopolitan genus Eumeces Wiegmann (Reptilia, Squamata, Scincidae). Russ. J. Herpetol. 7(1):1-16.
 Schmitz, Andreas; Patrick Mausfeld and Dirk Embert. 2004. Molecular studies on the genus Eumeces Wiegmann, 1834: phylogenetic relationships and taxonomic implications. Hamadryad 28(1-2):73-89.
 Sharma, R. C. 1970. A new lizard, Eumeces poonaensis (Scincidae) from India. Rec. Zool. Survey India, 62:239-241.

Eurylepis
Reptiles described in 1970
Taxa named by Ramesh Chandra Sharma